Cheleh Bar (also known as Chelehvar) is a village in Dasht-e Veyl Rural District, Rahmatabad and Blukat District, Rudbar County, Gilan Province, Iran. At the 2006 census, its population was 148, in 39 families.

References 

Populated places in Rudbar County